The 1998 Swisscom Challenge was a women's tennis tournament played on indoor hard courts at the Schluefweg in Zürich, Switzerland that was part of Tier I of the 1998 WTA Tour. It was the 15th edition of the tournament and was held from October 12 through October 18, 1998.

Finals

Singles

 Lindsay Davenport defeated  Venus Williams 7–5, 6–3
 It was Davenport's 6th title of the year and the 19th of her career.

Doubles

 Serena Williams /  Venus Williams defeated  Mariaan de Swardt /  Elena Tatarkova 5–7, 6–1, 6–3
 It was Serena Williams' 4th title of the year and the 4th of her career. It was Venus Williams' 7th title of the year and the 7th of her career.

External links
 WTA tournament draws

Swisscom Challenge
Zurich Open
1998 in Swiss tennis
1998 in Swiss women's sport